Rodrigo Eduardo Costa Marinho (born 27 March 1988), commonly known as Rodriguinho, is a Brazilian professional footballer who plays as an attacking midfielder for Cuiabá.

Rodriguinho started his senior professional career with ABC in 2007. After stints with Bragantino and América Mineiro, he joined Corinthians in 2013. In the 2017 season, he became the joint top-scorer of his team with 11 goals. Rodriguinho made his international debut with the Brazil national team on 25 January 2017, against Colombia.

Club career

Early career
Born in Natal, Rio Grande do Norte, Rodriguinho started his professional career with ABC in 2007. However, his playing time was limited and he considered becoming a professional futsal player. On 20 November 2009, he moved to Bragantino, with the club acquiring 30% of his rights. An undisputed starter, he also featured regularly for the reserves.

América Mineiro
On 11 May 2011, Rodriguinho moved to América Mineiro after agreeing to a deal which would keep him at the club until the end of 2012 Campeonato Mineiro. 11 days later, he made his first team debut in a league match against Bahia; scoring a goal in the 2–1 victory. On 30 July 2013, he scored a hat-trick and made two assists during a 5–0 victory against Sport Recife.

In August 2013, Rodriguinho played his 100th match for Coelho in a 1–1 draw against América-RN. Although in September, the club announced Rodriguinho's transfer to Qatari club El Jaish, the deal did not materialise It was later revealed that a problem in getting the work visa was the reason behind the deal getting cancelled. Nevertheless, Rodriguinho contributed with 25 goals in 103 matches for the club.

Corinthians
Rodriguinho moved to Corinthians on 30 September 2013 for $4 million, with the club acquiring 60% of his rights. In the following month, he made his debut in a 0–0 draw against Atlético Mineiro.

Loans to Grêmio and Al-Sharjah
On 14 April 2014, Rodriguinho joined Grêmio on a season long loan deal. However, after being rarely used, he left the club on 30 September. Two days later, he was loaned to Emirati club Al-Sharjah on a loan deal June 2015; joining three Brazilian compatriots at the club.

Breakthrough
Upon returning from loan in June 2015, Rodriguinho featured sparingly as the club won the 2015 Série A. From the 2016 season onwards, he became a regular starter for the club.

After being on the radar of several European clubs since July 2016, Corinthians rejected an offer from Turkish club Fenerbahçe in January 2017, to secure Rodriguinho's services. In the 2017 season, he became the joint top scorer of the club with 11 goals, with his side winning the Série A and Paulista.

Pyramids
On 21 July 2018, Egyptian side Pyramids FC announced the signing of Rodriguinho.

Cruzeiro
In January 2019, Rodriguinho returned to his home country after agreeing to a three-year deal with Cruzeiro, after the club paid a US$ 4 million fee. He was hampered by injuries during his spell at the club, and on 13 February 2020, he terminated his contract with the club.

Bahia
On 14 February 2020, one day after leaving Cruzeiro, Rodriguinho signed a contract with Bahia until December 2021. He was a regular starter for his new side, but suffered top tier relegation in 2021.

Cuiabá

On 30 December 2021, Rodriguinho was announced as one of the eight additions of Cuiabá.

International career
In January 2017, Rodriguinho was called to the national team for a friendly match against Colombia. He made his full international debut in on 26 January, replacing Willian Arão at half-time in the 1–0 win.

Personal life
In September 2012, Rodriguinho suffered a car accident after having lost control over the vehicle. Although he denied being drunk, he accepted the fact that his driving license had expired when he was driving the car.

Career statistics

Honours
ABC
 Campeonato Potiguar: 2007, 2008

Corinthians
 Campeonato Brasileiro Série A: 2015, 2017
 Campeonato Paulista: 2017, 2018

Cruzeiro
 Campeonato Mineiro: 2019

Bahia
 Campeonato Baiano: 2020
 Copa do Nordeste: 2021

Individual
Campeonato Paulista Team of the Year: 2017, 2018

References

External links
 Rodriguinho profile. Portal Oficial do Grêmio.
 Rodriguinho profile. Meu Timão.
 

Living people
1988 births
Brazilian footballers
Brazilian expatriate footballers
Brazilian expatriate sportspeople in the United Arab Emirates
Brazilian expatriate sportspeople in Egypt
Brazil international footballers
ABC Futebol Clube players
Clube Atlético Bragantino players
América Futebol Clube (MG) players
Sport Club Corinthians Paulista players
Grêmio Foot-Ball Porto Alegrense players
Sharjah FC players
Pyramids FC players
Cruzeiro Esporte Clube players
Esporte Clube Bahia players
Cuiabá Esporte Clube players
Campeonato Brasileiro Série A players
Campeonato Brasileiro Série B players
Campeonato Brasileiro Série C players
Expatriate footballers in the United Arab Emirates
Expatriate footballers in Egypt
UAE Pro League players
People from Natal, Rio Grande do Norte
Association football midfielders
Sportspeople from Rio Grande do Norte